"Football Is Our Religion" is a country-dance song by the Swedish band Rednex, released in 2008 via Universal Records, as the fifth single of their independently released third studio album The Cotton Eye Joe Show. The song serves as the unofficial song to UEFA Euro 2008 which took place in Austria and Switzerland in June of that year.

Track listing
"Football Is Our Religion" (Single Mix) - 3:34
"Football Is Our Religion" (Extended Mix) - 4:29
"Football Is Our Religion" (Alex C. Remix) - 4:15
"Thank God I'm a Country Boy" - 3:00

Charts

References

2008 singles
2008 songs
Rednex songs
Number-one singles in Sweden
Football songs and chants
Universal Records singles